Plainview High School may refer to:

Plainview High School in Plainview, Minnesota
Plainview High School in Plainview, Nebraska
Plainview High School in Ardmore, Oklahoma
Plainview High School (Texas) in Plainview, Texas